The AEW International Championship is a professional wrestling championship created and promoted by the American promotion All Elite Wrestling (AEW). It is a secondary championship for male wrestlers, and unlike AEW's other titles, which are almost exclusively defended on AEW programming, the International Championship can also be defended in other promotions internationally. The current and inaugural International champion is Orange Cassidy, who is in his first reign.

Established as the AEW All-Atlantic Championship on June 8, 2022, the title was created to represent AEW's fans from around the world, but with no particular focus on the Atlantic Ocean or countries surrounding it. The inaugural champion was Pac. Since its establishment, the title has been defended in the Revolution Pro Wrestling and Over the Top Wrestling promotions, although most of its defenses have occurred in AEW. On March 8, 2023, the title was renamed the AEW International Championship.

History

On the June 8, 2022, episode of Dynamite, the American professional wrestling promotion All Elite Wrestling (AEW) unveiled the AEW All-Atlantic Championship to be a secondary championship for the men's division. Despite its name seemingly centering on countries around the Atlantic, the company announced that the championship "represents the AEW Fans watching around the world in over 130 countries". The inaugural champion was crowned in a four-way match which was held at the AEW x NJPW: Forbidden Door pay-per-view event on June 26, which was co-produced with the Japanese promotion New Japan Pro-Wrestling (NJPW). To determine the competitors in the four-way, six qualifying matches were held. Three of these featured wrestlers from AEW with the three winners advancing to the four-way match. The other three qualifying matches were held between four wrestlers from NJPW in a single-elimination tournament fashion. The winners of NJPW's preliminary qualifiers faced off and the winner of that match advanced to the four-way match at Forbidden Door. On the AEW side, Pac, Miro, and Malakai Black won their qualifiers; on the NJPW side, Tomohiro Ishii qualified but suffered a left knee injury and had to be replaced with the runner-up, Clark Connors. At Forbidden Door, Pac became the inaugural champion by submitting Connors.

In an interview with Robbie Fox on the My Mom's Basement podcast,  AEW president Tony Khan confirmed that the championship would be defended differently than the company's other titles. Khan said that holders of the All-Atlantic Championship would defend the title around the world in other promotions, in addition to AEW. This interview came shortly after Pac defended the title at a Revolution Pro Wrestling event, which was later shown on AEW's YouTube show, Dark, on July 12. Pac also defended the title at an Over the Top Wrestling event on July 22.

On the March 8, 2023, episode of Dynamite, Tony Khan announced that Orange Cassidy's defense of the title that night was the final as the AEW All-Atlantic Championship, as the following week, in celebration of the release of the Warner Bros. film Shazam! Fury of the Gods, the title would be rebranded as the AEW International Championship due to AEW's broadcast partnership with Warner Bros. Discovery.

Inaugural tournament

Reigns

Pac was the inaugural champion. He is also the shortest reigning champion at 108 days, while Orange Cassidy's ongoing reign is the longest at + days. Pac is also the youngest champion when he won the title at 35, while Cassidy is the oldest at 38.

Orange Cassidy is the current and longest reigning champion in his first reign. He defeated Jeff Jarrett to become inaugural International champion on the March 15, 2023, episode of Dynamite in Winnipeg, MB, Canada.

References

External link 
 Official AEW All-Atlantic Championship History at All Elite Wrestling

All Elite Wrestling championships
International professional wrestling championships
2022 introductions